Yue-Sai Kan is an American, international television host and producer, successful entrepreneur, fashion icon, bestselling author and humanitarian. People magazine called her "the most famous woman in China" and Time magazine proclaimed her "the Queen of the Middle Kingdom."

Early life
Yue-Sai was born in Guilin, China and grew up in Hong Kong. Her father Kan Wing-Lin was a revered traditional Chinese painter and calligrapher. In 1968, while studying as a piano major at Brigham Young University in Hawaii, Yue-Sai entered the Narcissus Flower Beauty Pageant sponsored by the local Chinese Chamber of Commerce. She became the second runner-up, and as part of her duties traveled around the world. The life-changing experience marked the beginning of her career in fashion, beauty, communication and cultural exchange.

Work in Television

In 1972, Kan moved to New York City. Soon after she formed Yue-Sai Kan Productions and created her first major TV production, a weekly series called "Looking East". The program was the first of its kind to introduce Asian cultures and customs to a growing and receptive American audience. It garnered critical acclaim and won dozens of awards. As described by the New York Times: "Few people are able to bridge the East and West, but Yue-Sai Kan can, and does it with beauty, intelligence and grace." The series stayed on the air for 12 years, the last 2 years on the Discovery Channel. Based on this and other work Kan is credited as the first TV journalist to connect the East and West.

In 1984, PBS invited Kan to host the first live broadcast from China on the occasion of the 35th Anniversary of the People's Republic of China. The inaugural US-China joint telecast opened the door for many collaborations between the two countries' television industries. Two years later the bilingual television series "One World" produced and hosted by Kan aired on China's national television network CCTV, with a weekly viewership of 300 million, giving many Chinese their first glimpse of the outside world. Her broadcast captivated the entire nation and made her a household name in China. It inspired millions of young people to learn English and travel abroad. At that time with broadcasts in both China and the US, Kan was the most watched woman in the world. The bilingual scripts and videos of "One World" were used as teaching materials in schools across China and her easy hosting style influenced a generation of TV journalists in China.

Kan's other US TV credits include narrating the ABC documentary "China: Walls and Bridges", which received a Daytime Emmy Award. "Journey through a Changing China" was syndicated across the country and was so powerful that it was publicly lauded in the US Congressional Record, which called Kan a "citizen ambassador". The popular series "Mini Dragons" and "Doing Business in Asia", which Kan produced and hosted, were broadcast on PBS, fed the West's growing hunger for information of the East. A corporate version of the series was created and thousands of copies were sold to corporations and university business schools throughout the world for many years. Kan has continued to produce a variety of television shows aimed at raising the Chinese consciousness about the latest international lifestyle trends, including segments for the popular CCTV program "Half of the Sky" and more recently "Yue-Sai's World" and "Yue-Sai's Expo". Kan has filmed in more than 25 countries, created thousands of programs, and been viewed all over the globe.

Entrepreneur

In 1992, Kan successfully transformed herself from a TV personality to an entrepreneur by creating the Yue-Sai cosmetics brand which became China's leading cosmetics company, eventually selling products in more than 800 outlets through 23 regional companies in China's major markets. The company encouraged Chinese women to be proud of their image, and was an early entrant to the cosmetics industry in China. More than 90% of the Chinese population today recognizes the brand, which was purchased by L'Oréal in 2004. Forbes reported that Kan "is changing the face of the Middle Kingdom, one lipstick at a time". Kanstayed on as the Honorary Vice Chairman of L'Oreal China.

In 2008, Kan created a new East-meets-West lifestyle retail brand, the House of Yue-Sai, selling a variety of fine home furnishings, bedding, tableware, lighting, decorative accessories and unique gifts, and jewelry. Kan has also designed and produced a line of Asian female dolls, known as the Yue-Sai WaWa ("doll" in Chinese). Seeing that dolls sold in China had blue eyes and blond hair, Kan created dolls with distinctive Asian features, accessories and educational facts to help Asian children develop confidence, knowledge and pride in their heritage as well as educate children of all heritages about Asian cultures.

Books
Kan has written nine best-selling books in China, dispensing advice about television production, beauty and etiquette to the modern Chinese. Her first publication Yue-Sai's Guide to Asian Beauty which teaches basic makeup and personal styling techniques, instantly became a must-have handbook for Chinese women. Encouraged by the Chinese Ministry of Culture, Kan introduced international social standards to China with her book Etiquette for the Modern Chinese. The subsequent rewrites The Chinese Gentleman and The Complete Chinese Woman served as virtual training manuals for volunteers at the 2008 Beijing Olympics and the 2010 Shanghai World Expo. In 2009, Kan published Exquisite Spaces, 25 Top Interior Designers of the World, a coffee table book featuring design philosophies and tips from world-class designers, and their works. It was the first time that an interior design book of such magnitude was made available in China. Life is a Competition and 99 Ways to Live a Charmed Life were published in 2013 and 2014 respectively, targeting young Chinese looking for advice in career, relationships and all-round development. Currently, Kan is working on her tenth book.

Humanitarian work and cultural ambassador 
Throughout her life, Kan has been deeply involved in charity. Her philanthropic initiatives include a donation of nearly $200,000 to the United Nations World Conference on Women in Beijing in 1995 when Yue-Sai Cosmetics was barely 3 years in operation, and a scholarship program set up in 1997 at the prestigious Peking University for outstanding female students. Over the years, Kan built schools and libraries in underprivileged regions of China. In 2002, UNICEF named her, alongside other international leaders and celebrities, as its first and only Global Chinese "Say Yes for Children" ambassador. By chairing one of China's biggest charitable organizations the Shanghai Soong Ching Ling Foundation's 2010 annual gala, Kan helped raise over $1.5 million to support 12 hospitals in remote regions of China. To acknowledge her tremendous contribution, the Shanghai Soong Qing Ling Foundation sanctioned the establishment of the China Beauty Charity Fund (CBCF) and appointed Kan as Ambassador and Chairman. The CBCF with its sister entity in the US is dedicated to the betterment and advancement of women and children through education, health and cultural programs worldwide. Currently, Kan is a member of the Committee of 100 which is composed of outstanding Chinese Americans. She sits on the board of the Ellis Island Honors Society and Prince Albert of Monaco's Philanthropy Round Table. She is a member of the Metropolitan Museum of Art's International Council. In early 2018, Kan became co-chair of China Institute in America, a century old non-profit organization dedicated to fostering a deeper understanding of China through programs in education, culture, art, and business. She shares the chairmanship with Chien Chung Pei, son of architect I. M. Pei.

In 2006, Kan started serving as Chairman of the Invitation Committee of the Shanghai International Film Festival (SIFF), the largest film festival in Asia. Her title changed to SIFF International Ambassador in 2015. Kan secured the attendance of nearly 50 international A-list filmmakers, including Oliver Stone, Daniel Boyle, Tom Hooper, Jean-Jacques Annaud, Quincy Jones, Halle Berry, Catherine Deneuve, Susan Sarandon, Adrien Brody, Claire Danes, Hugh Grant, Meg Ryan, Sophie Marceau.

Since 2011, Kan has been serving as the National Director of Miss Universe China. Kan stated that the three aims of the Pageant during her administration are supporting education and charity, and creating a positive image of Chinese women. She mentored seven Miss China titleholders, all of whom represented China well at the Miss Universe Final Pageant. Additionally, Kan turned the Miss Universe China Final Pageant into the most glamorous charity ball gathering the who's who in Shanghai each year. Proceeds are used to support orphanages, sponsor cleft lip and palate correction surgeries and fund scholarships for students in China's best music, TV and film schools. Kan also champions Chinese creativity via her annual China Fashion Gala in New York. The Gala boosted the international standing of Chinese photographers Chen Man and Sun Jun as well as designers Lan Yu, Grace Chen and fashion designer Jason Wu. Renowned Chinese couture designer Guo Pei has Kan to thank for when her creations were picked up by the Metropolitan Museum of Art following her debut at the China Fashion Gala.

Honors
Kan is the first and only living American featured on a government-issued Chinese postage stamp which was issued in 2002. In 2005, a new version was published to keep up with her new hairdo. Her long list of awards and accolades includes the Magnolia Award from the Shanghai Municipal Government for her contribution to the economic and social development of Shanghai, "20 Most Influential Women Around the Globe" by Xinhua News Agency and the permanent establishment of a "Yue-Sai Day" in Hawaii which falls on October 6 every year.

Kan received the Ellis Island Medal of Honor as an outstanding Chinese American immigrant and the Ban Ki-moon Award from Asia Initiatives.

In 2016, Kan received the Women's Entrepreneurship Day Pioneer Award in recognition for her achievements in the business world.

References

External links

Yue-Sai Kan biography
Yue-Sai Kan's Official Weibo
WeChat public account is Jin_yu_xi
Miss Universe China Official Website
Charlie Rose Interview with Yue-Sai Kan

American people of Chinese descent
Living people
Members of Committee of 100
1949 births
Brigham Young University–Hawaii alumni
People from Guilin
Hong Kong emigrants to the United States
American television hosts
American women television presenters